The Last Testament is a 1929 German-Czech silent film directed by Rolf Randolf and starring Carlo Aldini, Daisy D'Ora, and Hans Junkermann.

The film's art direction was by Heinrich Richter.

Cast

References

Bibliography

External links 
 

1929 films
Films of the Weimar Republic
Films directed by Rolf Randolf
German silent feature films
Czech silent films
German black-and-white films
Czech black-and-white films
1920s German films